The 1969 Singapore Open, also known as the 1969 Singapore Open Badminton Championships, took place from 30 October – 2 November 1969 at the Singapore Badminton Hall in Singapore.

Venue
Singapore Badminton Hall

Final results

References 

Singapore Open (badminton)
1969 in badminton
1969 in Singaporean sport